Qaleh Aqa (also Romanized as Qal‘eh Āqā; also known as Qal‘eh Āghā) is a village in Zirkuh Rural District, Bagh-e Bahadoran District, Lenjan County, Isfahan Province, Iran. At the 2006 census, its population was 370, in 104 families.

References 

Populated places in Lenjan County